Margaret "Pegeen" Hanrahan (born c. 1966) was the mayor of Gainesville, Florida, her native city, from 2004 through 2010. Described by The Nation as a "vegetarian, bike-riding environmentalist", Hanrahan has been active in politics since she was a teenager. An environmental engineer, she was elected to the Gainesville City Commission in 1996, and was elected mayor in 2004. In the 2007 mayoral election she was re-elected to another term.

Early life and career
Hanrahan received her bachelor's and master's degrees in environmental engineering, as well as a B.A. in sociology, all with honors from the University of Florida.  In 2003 she married Tony Malone, a professional engineer in civil infrastructure.  Together they have a daughter, Evyleen Mary, born in 2005; a son, Quinn Joseph, born in 2007; and a daughter, Tess Lucille, born in 2011.

Electoral history

Mayor Hanrahan was re-elected on March 6, 2007, beating her opponent Wesley Watson with 73% of the vote.

References

External links
 Mayor's page at City of Gainesville Web site
 Campaign Web site
 Profile by The Independent Florida Alligator

21st-century American women
Florida Democrats
Living people
Mayors of Gainesville, Florida
Mayors of places in Florida
University of Florida alumni
Women mayors of places in Florida
Year of birth missing (living people)